Kihari is a populated place in the Union Council of Sirikot, North-West Frontier Province, Pakistan.

Description
Kihari is in a mountainous area west of Haripur District west of the Tarbela Dam. The majority of the population of is Hindko speaking, from the Gujjar and Awan groups.
Some speak Pashto as their mother tongue.

Other villages close to Kihari
Choi, Mani, Nadi Kihari, Osmān Māni, Dorah, Bail' Garhan, Gallai, Damrah, Darrah, Chola, K. Gali, Shiftalo Shareef, Chountrai, Batgram, and others.

Noted residents
Politicians
 Pir Sabir Shah - ex-Chief minister NWFP
 Pir Hamid Shah - Union Council Nazim

Populated places in Haripur District